SATC may refer to:

Inmarsat-C, a satellite communications system sometimes called SATC or SAT-C
Reserve Officers' Training Corps, US military training academy, formerly Student Army Training Corps (during World War I) 
Salina Area Technical College, a technical college in Salina, Kansas, US.
Sabena Airline Training Center, airline transport pilot school located in Mesa, Arizona, US
Sex and the City (book), by Candace Bushnell.
Sex and the City, a TV series that was shown on HBO from 1998 until 2004, based on the book.
Sex and the City (film), based on the TV show
Sex and the City: Original Motion Picture Soundtrack, soundtrack to the film
Software Assurance Technology Center
South Atlantic tropical cyclone
South Australian Tourism Commission
State Theatre Company of South Australia, formerly South Australian Theatre Company or SATC